"Advice for the Young at Heart" is a song by the English band Tears for Fears, taken from their 1989 album The Seeds of Love. It was released as the third single from the album in February 1990.

The song was written by Roland Orzabal and keyboardist/singer Nicky Holland. The lead vocal was sung by Curt Smith (the only track on the whole The Seeds of Love album that he sang lead vocals on).

The single only reached #89 in the US Billboard 100 but was a Top 40 hit in the UK (#36), France (#31), Canada (#25) and The Netherlands (#22), and a Top 20 hit in Ireland (#15).  In 1992, when Tears for Fears released Tears Roll Down (Greatest Hits 82–92), "Advice for the Young at Heart" was re-released in Brazil.

While the album version was mixed by David Bascombe, the single version was mixed by Bob Clearmountain. The single mix was included on the 2020 deluxe edition of The Seeds of Love.

Music video
The video for the song was filmed in Florida and was directed by Andy Morahan. It features a wedding interspersed with shots of the band performing.

Track listings
 CD single
 "Advice for the Young at Heart" — 4:49
 "Johnny Panic and the Bible of Dreams" — 4:16
 "Music for Tables" — 3:32
 "Johnny Panic And the Bible of Dreams" (instrumental) — 4:18

 7" single
 "Advice for the Young at Heart" — 4:45
 "Johnny Panic and the Bible of Dreams" — 4:16

 12" single
 "Advice for the Young at Heart" — 4:49
 "Johnny Panic and the Bible of Dreams" — 4:16
 "Music for Tables" — 3:32

Chart

References

1989 songs
1990 singles
Fontana Records singles
Music videos directed by Andy Morahan
Songs written by Nicky Holland
Songs written by Roland Orzabal
Tears for Fears songs